Chong Tsu-pin is a Taiwanese football manager.

Career
Chong was the head coach of the Chinese Taipei women's national team at the 1991 FIFA Women's World Cup.

References

External links
 
 
 Chong Tsu-pin at Soccerdonna.de 

Year of birth missing (living people)
Living people
Taiwanese football managers
Women's association football managers
Chinese Taipei women's national football team managers
1991 FIFA Women's World Cup managers